Tom Kingston (born 3 May 1988) is an Australian former professional rugby league footballer. He previously played for the Gold Coast Titans in the National Rugby League. He primarily played .

Background
Born in Tweed Heads, New South Wales, Kingston attended St. Josephs' Primary School and St. Joseph's College, Tweed Heads and played his junior football for the Tweed Heads Seagulls before being signed by the Gold Coast Titans.

Playing career
In 2008, Kingston played for the Gold Coast Titans' NYC team before moving on to the Titans' Queensland Cup team, Tweed Heads Seagulls in 2009.

In Round 17 of the 2014 NRL season, Kingston made his NRL debut for the Titans against the South Sydney Rabbitohs.

On 12 September 2014, Kingston re-signed with the Titans on a 1-year contract.

On 5 November 2014, Kingston decided to quit rugby league to take up a post in the Australian Defence Force.

References

External links
2014 Gold Coast Titans profile

1988 births
Living people
Australian rugby league players
Gold Coast Titans players
Tweed Heads Seagulls players
Rugby league second-rows
Rugby league players from Tweed Heads, New South Wales